Statistics of Primera Fuerza in season 1910-11.

Overview
It was contested by 3 teams, and Reforma won the championship.

League standings

Top goalscorers
Players sorted first by goals scored, then by last name.

References
Mexico - List of final tables (RSSSF)

1910-11
Mex
1910–11 in Mexican football